Millward is a surname.

Millward  may also refer to:

 Millward Township, Aitkin County, Minnesota, township in Aitkin County, Minnesota, United States
 Kantar Millward Brown, global research agency, part of the Kantar Group
Caroline Millward House, historic house, Maywood, Illinois, United States